is a city located in Saitama Prefecture, Japan. , the city had an estimated population of 152,569 in 67,339 households and a population density of 1900 persons per km².

Geography
Kuki is located in northeastern Saitama Prefecture, approximately 50 kilometers from downtown Tokyo in the alluvial plains of the Tone River.

Surrounding municipalities
Saitama Prefecture
 Kazo
 Satte
 Okegawa
 Kōnosu
 Hasuda
 Shiraoka
 Sugito
 Miyashiro
Ibaraki Prefecture
 Koga
 Goka

Climate
Kuki has a humid subtropical climate (Köppen Cfa) characterized by warm summers and cool winters with light to no snowfall.  The average annual temperature in Kuki is 14.6 °C. The average annual rainfall is 1338 mm with September as the wettest month. The temperatures are highest on average in August, at around 26.7 °C, and lowest in January, at around 3.6 °C.

Demographics
Per Japanese census data, the population of Kuki has recently plateaued after a long period of growth.

History
During the Sengoku period, the Koga kubō Ashikaga Masauji retired to the temple of Kantō-in, which is located within what is now Kuki. During the Edo period, Kuki Domain (10,000 koku) under the control of the Yonekitsu clan existed from 1684 to 1798.  The town of Kuki was created within Minamisaitama District, Saitama with the establishment of the modern municipalities system on April 1, 1889. On July 1, 1954, Kuki merged with the neighboring villages of Ota, Ezura and Kiyoku. Kuki was elevated to city status on October 1, 1971. On March 23, 2010, Kuki absorbed the town of Shōbu (Minamisaitama District), and the towns of Kurihashi and Washimiya (both from Kitakatsushika District).

Government
Kuki has a mayor-council form of government with a directly elected mayor and a [[

unicameral
]] city council of 27 members. Kuki contributes two members to the Saitama Prefectural Assembly. In terms of national politics, the city is divided between the Saitama 13th district and Saitama 14th districts of the lower house of the Diet of Japan.

Economy
Kuki remains primarily an agricultural area, with rice as the predominant crop. The city has three industrial parks.

Education
Tokyo University of Science has a campus at Kuki.
Kuki has 23 public elementary schools and 11 public middle schools operated by the city government, and five public high schools operated by the Saitama Prefectural Board of Education.  The prefecture also operates one special education school for the handicapped.

Transportation

Railway
 JR East – Utsunomiya Line (Tōhoku Main Line),
 –  – 
 Tōbu Railway –  Tōbu Isesaki Line
 –  
 Tōbu Railway – Tōbu Nikkō Line
 –

Highway
  – Shobu Parking Area – Kuki-Shiraoka Junction
  – Kuki-Shiraoka Junction – Kuki Interchange

Local attractions 
The city is famous as the setting of anime series Lucky Star and The Fruit of Grisaia, bringing thousands of anime tourists to see Washinomiya Shrine each year.

Sister city relations
 - Roseburg, Oregon, USA

References

External links

Official Website 
Kuki-citizen website 

Cities in Saitama Prefecture
Kuki, Saitama